Spectamen euteium is a species of sea snail, a marine gastropod mollusk in the family Solariellidae.

Description
The size of the shell attains 6 mm.

Distribution
This marine species occurs off Indonesia.

References

 Vilvens C. (2009). New species and new records of Solariellidae (Gastropoda: Trochoidea) from Indonesia and Taiwan. Novapex 10(3): 69–96

External links
 
 Vilvens, C. (2009). New species and new records of Solariellidae (Gastropoda: Trochoidea) from Indonesia and Taiwan. Novapex. 10 (3): 69-96
 Williams S.T., Kano Y., Warén A. & Herbert D.G. (2020). Marrying molecules and morphology: first steps towards a reevaluation of solariellid genera (Gastropoda: Trochoidea) in the light of molecular phylogenetic studies. Journal of Molluscan Studies. 86(1): 1–26

euteium
Gastropods described in 2009